Adam Werner (born May 2, 1997) is a Swedish professional ice hockey goaltender currently playing for the Malmö Redhawks of the Swedish Hockey League (SHL). Werner was drafted by the Colorado Avalanche, 131st overall, in the 2016 NHL Entry Draft.

Playing career

Färjestad BK 
Werner first played as a youth with his hometown club, Mariestad BoIS HC, up to the Under-18 level. On 6 June 2013, having shown early potential in using his size to complement his style, Werner was signed under the eye of goaltending scout Erik Granqvist by SHL club Färjestad BK to continue his development at the U18 and J20 SuperElit leagues.

In his first season within Färjestad BK in 2013–14, Werner lead the league at the U18 Elite level in goals against average and save percentage. Continuing his growth in the 2014–15 season, on 1 November 2014, having been promoted for the start of the SHL season, Werner made his professional debut as a 17-year old whilst serving in his second game as backup, coming off the bench for 3 minutes in a game against Leksands IF. Werner were returned to become a fixture of the J20 side, appearing in 14 games and earning recognition in joining the Swedish junior program.

In his second year in the J20 SuperElit, Werner improved his statistics from the previous year in 30 games with Färjestad. Unable to add to his SHL experience in the 2015–16 season, he was loaned to Hockeyettan clubs with brief appearances for Köping HC and Forshaga IF. He was also loaned to HockeyAllsvenskan club, IF Björklöven. In making an impression from practicing with the squad, Werner failed to feature in Allsvenskan games before returning to Färjestad.

On April 15, 2016, Werner was signed to a one-year extension with Färjestad to solidify his position as the club's third choice keeper at the age of 19. In order to progress his game, on 19 April 2016, Werner was re-loaned to IF Björklöven for the duration of the 2016–17 season. Assuming starting goaltender status with Björklöven, Werner appeared in 25 games in posting 12 wins as the club was unable to progress to the post-season. In the midst of the season, Werner was selected to the national junior team as Sweden's third choice goaltender at the 2017 World Junior Championships.

In continuing his development, Werner agreed to a new two-year contract to remain under contract with Färjestad on March 15, 2017. It was announced that Werner would extend his tenure on loan with Björklöven for the 2017–18 season on March 22, 2017. In resuming with Björklöven, Werner won the starting role and led the league in minutes played through 47 appearances. In a successful season he recorded 26 wins and a 2.34 GAA to help qualify for the playoffs. At the conclusion of the season with Björklöven, Werner traveled to North America and signed an amateur try-out deal with the Avalanche's American Hockey League affiliate, the San Antonio Rampage on 26 March 2018. He made his North American debut in a relief appearance, allowing 2 goals, during a 6–3 defeat to the Cleveland Monsters on April 6, 2018. He made his first start against the same opponent two days later, recording his first win in a 4–3 victory on 8 April 2018. With the conclusion of the regular season ending his try-out deal with the Rampage, Werner finished with 2 wins in 4 games.

In the 2018–19 season, Werner was elevated to initially assume backup duties with Färjestad BK. In a successful season, establishing himself in the SHL, Werner would share the goaltender duties with veteran Markus Svensson and finished with a 15–6–3 record, 2.02 goals-against average and a .926 save percentage in 26 games. With Färjestad the number 1 seed leading into the post-season, he started the opening playoff game in a 2–1 overtime defeat to HV71 on March 22, 2019, before taking on the backup role for the remainder of the playoffs.

Colorado Avalanche 
On 14 May 2019, Werner was signed by the Colorado Avalanche to a two-year, entry-level contract. In his first season in North America, Werner attended the Avalanche's training camp before he was assigned to begin the 2019–20 season with AHL affiliate, the Colorado Eagles on 23 September 2019. Acclimatising to the North American rink, Werner started in 9 of the Eagles first 11 games, collecting his first shutout in a 4–0 victory over the Ontario Reign on 5 November 2019. On 7 November 2019, with the Avalanche suffering an injury to starting goaltender Philipp Grubauer, Werner was recalled for the first time to serve in a backup role.

Assuming the backup duties on 12 November 2019, Werner unexpectedly made his NHL debut against the Winnipeg Jets, after Pavel Francouz was injured in the opening minute of the game. In playing 59 minutes, he backstopped the Avalanche to a 4–0 shutout victory over the Jets, not allowing a goal on 40 shots. In recording his first win, Werner became the first goalie in Avalanche/Nordiques franchise history to win his debut in relief, while becoming just the ninth goaltender in the NHL to collect 40 or more saves in his debut since 1955–56. With both Avalanche goaltenders sidelined through injury, Werner was given his first start in against the Edmonton Oilers on 14 November 2019. Allowing a Connor McDavid hatrick and 5 goals in 18 shots, Werner was pulled midway into the second period in an eventual 6–2 defeat. Having made 2 appearances with the Avalanche, Werner was returned to the Eagles on 19 November.

Approaching the second season of his entry-level contract, and with the 2020–21 delayed North American season, Werner remained in Sweden, loaned by the Colorado Avalanche to resume playing with HC Vita Hästen of the Allsvenskan on 16 September 2020. Werner made just 5 appearances with Vita Hästen, posting 2 wins, before his loan was ended and returned to North America.

Following his second full season in North America, Werner having concluded his entry-level deal was not tendered a qualifying offer by the Avalanche, and was released to free agency on 26 July 2021.

Calgary Flames
Werner was signed on the opening day of free agency, agreeing to a one-year, two-way contract with the Calgary Flames on July 28, 2021. In the following 2021–22 season, Werner was assigned by the Flames to play exclusively with AHL affiliate, the Stockton Heat. In 21 appearances and assuming the role as the Heat's backup goaltender to Dustin Wolf, Werner collected 12 wins and a .886 save percentage.

Malmö Redhawks
As an impending restricted free agent from the Flames, Werner opted to return to his native Sweden and resume his SHL career in agreeing to a two-year contract with the Malmö Redhawks on 20 June 2022.

Career statistics

Regular season and playoffs

International

References

External links

1997 births
Living people
IF Björklöven players
Colorado Avalanche draft picks
Colorado Avalanche players
Colorado Eagles players
Färjestad BK players
Malmö Redhawks players
San Antonio Rampage players
Stockton Heat players
Swedish ice hockey goaltenders
HC Vita Hästen players